Sir Charles Edmonstone, 2nd Baronet (10 October 1764 – 1 April 1821), also 12th of Duntreath, was a Scottish politician.

Edmonstone was the third son of Sir Archibald Edmonstone, 1st Baronet. He was educated at Eton College and subsequently at Christ Church, Oxford. Having been called to the Bar, he was one of the six clerks in Chancery until the time of his father's death. In 1806, he was elected Member for Dumbartonshire, but he lost his seat in the general election of the following year. In 1812, he became member of parliament for Stirlingshire and held the seat until his death. A Tory like his father, he supported Lord Liverpool's government during the later part of the Napoleonic Wars.

Edmonstone married firstly, Emma, daughter of Richard Wilbraham Bootle of Rode Hall, Cheshire, by whom he had a son and a daughter. He married secondly on 5 December 1804 Louisa Hotham (9 October 1778 – 30 August 1840), daughter of Beaumont Hotham, 2nd Baron Hotham, by whom he had four sons and two daughters. His second daughter, Louisa Henrietta, married John Kingston of Demerara in 1829. He died at Brighton in 1821, apparently from a stroke, aged fifty eight, and was succeeded by his eldest son.

References

www.edmonstone.com

External links 
 

1764 births
1821 deaths
Alumni of Christ Church, Oxford
Baronets in the Baronetage of Great Britain
Members of the Parliament of the United Kingdom for Scottish constituencies
People educated at Eton College
UK MPs 1806–1807
UK MPs 1812–1818
UK MPs 1818–1820
UK MPs 1820–1826
Charles